A Stand Up Guy is a 2016 American comedy film written and directed by Mike Young and starring Danny A. Abeckaser, Michael Rapaport, Ethan Suplee and Bob Saget. The film was released direct to DVD and digital platforms on February 9, 2016.

Plot
Sammy Lagucci is a Brooklyn-based criminal who would only change his life for his little daughter. When he finds out that the gangsters he's related to are plotting to take him down, he enters the witness protection program to protect himself and his family. Ending up in a small Wisconsin town, he finds himself a good stand-up comedian and succeeds. But what should be a blessing turns into a curse as your fame grows, putting your new identity at stake.

Cast
Danny A. Abeckaser as Sammy Lagucci
Annie Heise as Vicky
Nick Cordero as Sal
Luke Robertson as Dom
Jay R. Ferguson as Manny
Ethan Suplee as Marshal
Michael Rapaport as Colin
Bob Saget as Mel

References

External links
 
 

2016 comedy films
American comedy films
Films about the American Mafia
Films about witness protection
2010s English-language films
2010s American films